Pleasant Valley is an unincorporated community in Carroll County, Arkansas, United States. The community is located on Arkansas Highway 143.

References

Unincorporated communities in Carroll County, Arkansas
Unincorporated communities in Arkansas